The Karnataka State Film Awards 2006–07, presented by Government of Karnataka, to felicitate the best of Kannada Cinema released in the year 2006.

Lifetime achievement award

Jury 

A committee headed by Nagathihalli Chandrashekar was appointed to evaluate the awards.

Film Awards

Other Awards

References

Karnataka State Film Awards